National Anthem is a 2023 drama film directed by Luke Gilford, in his debut feature-length picture, who co-wrote the screenplay with David Largman Murray and Kevin Best. The film stars Charlie Plummer, Eve Lindley, Mason Alexander Park, Rene Rosado, and Robyn Lively.

It premiered at the 2023 SXSW Festival on March 10, 2023, and has received positive reviews from critics, with praise going towards the directing, screenplay, cinematography, and performances of its cast (particularly Plummer and Lindley).

Synopsis 
Dylan (Plummer), a 21-year-old who lives in rural New Mexico and works as a construction worker to help support his little brother and alcoholic mother, joins a community of queer ranchers and rodeo performers.

Cast 
 Charlie Plummer as Dylan
 Eve Lindley as Sky
 Mason Alexander Park as Carrie
 Rene Rosado as Pepe
 Robyn Lively as Fiona

Production 
The film was directed by Luke Gilford, marking his feature film debut. The screenplay was co-written by Gilford, David Largman Murray, and Kevin Best, and was inspired by Gilford's monograph titled National Anthem: America's Queer Rodeo.

Release 
The film premiered at the 2023 SXSW Festival on March 10, 2023.

Reception 
Upon its premiere, National Anthem has been met with positive critical reviews. On the review aggregator website Rotten Tomatoes, the film holds an approval rating of 100% based on 8 critic reviews, with an average rating of 7.6/10. Metacritic, which uses a weighted average, assigned a score of 74 out of 100, based on 5 reviews indicating "generally favourable reviews".

Brian Tallerico of RogerEbert.com described the film as "both progressive and old-fashioned at the same time" and wrote "Gilford has a strong eye—he captures the wide-open spaces of this beautiful country with a blend of awe and grace—but it's his work with performers and characters that announces a major talent." He also highlighted the performances of Plummer, Lindley, and Park as the standouts. Deadline Hollywood's Damon Wise said that the film presents "a sweetness and simplicity to its philosophy of see-and-be-seen that will likely make this an easy festival crowd-pleaser."

Writing for Paste, Aurora Amidon gave the film a score of 8.5 out of 10, writing that "the beauty of National Anthem is that it effortlessly challenges all expectations and preconceived notions", and lauded the directing, screenplay, and performances of Plummer and Lindley. Erin Brady of /Film gave it a score of 8 out 10 and named it "a moving and well-crafted debut." She also praised the cinematography, screenplay, and performances of Plummer and Lindley, and called Gilford "a powerful voice in modern queer art."

References

External links 

 

American drama films
2020s English-language films
American LGBT-related films
2023 films
2023 LGBT-related films
2023 directorial debut films